Jo Zeller (born 17 July 1955 in Männedorf) is a Swiss racing driver. He has raced in such series as Austria Formula 3 Cup and is a twelve-time Swiss Formula Three champion. In the early 1990s, he set up his own racing team, Jo Zeller Racing, which has raced in series such as Formula 3 Euro Series, Formula Lista Junior, Austria Formula 3 Cup and the German Formula Three Championship.

References

External links
 Jo Zeller Racing official website 
 

1955 births
Living people
People from Meilen District
Swiss racing drivers
Swiss Formula Three Championship drivers
Sportspeople from the canton of Zürich

Austrian Formula Three Championship drivers
Motorsport team owners
Jo Zeller Racing drivers